Alontae Devaun Taylor (born December 3, 1998) is an American football cornerback for the New Orleans Saints of the National Football League (NFL). He played college football at Tennessee.

High school career
Taylor attended Coffee County Central High School in Manchester, Tennessee. He played quarterback in high school and during his career, he had 8,225 yards of total offense and 75 touchdowns. Taylor played in the 2018 Under Armour All-American Game. He committed to the University of Tennessee to play college football.

College career
Taylor played at Tennessee under head coaches Jeremy Pruitt and Josh Heupel from 2018 to 2021. He originally played wide receiver at Tennessee before transitioning to cornerback prior to his freshman year. He became a starter his freshman year and overall started 31 of 45 career games. Taylor finished his career with 162 tackles, four interceptions, one pick-six, and one fumble recovery for a touchdown. He decided to sit out the 2021 Music City Bowl in preparation for the 2022 NFL Draft.

Professional career

Taylor was drafted by the New Orleans Saints in the second round, 49th overall, in the 2022 NFL Draft.  He was placed on injured reserve on September 24, 2022. He was activated on October 20. In his rookie season, Taylor appeared in 13 games, of which he started nine. He finished with 46 total tackles and 11 passes defensed.

References

External links

 New Orleans Saints bio
Tennessee Volunteers bio

1998 births
Living people
Players of American football from Tennessee
American football cornerbacks
Tennessee Volunteers football players
New Orleans Saints players
People from Manchester, Tennessee